The 9th National People's Congress was in session from 1998 to 2003. It held five plenary sessions in this period. It followed the final session of the 8th National People's Congress. There were 2,979 deputies to this Congress.

Election results

Elected state leaders
President of the People's Republic of China: Jiang Zemin
Chairman of the Standing Committee of the National People's Congress: Li Peng
Premier of the State Council: Zhu Rongji
Chairman of the Central Military Commission: Jiang Zemin
President of the Supreme People's Court: Xiao Yang
Procurator-General of the Supreme People's Procuratorate: Han Zhubin

Congress results
This was the first congress in which deputies were elected representing the Hong Kong SAR and the new directly-administered city of Chongqing.

Elections were held from October 1997 to February 1998 by the 22 provincial and 5 autonomous regional legislatures, as well as the city legislatures of the four  directly-administered municipalities, which elected their deputies to the NPC.

|-
! style="background-color:#E9E9E9;text-align:left;vertical-align:top;" |Parties
!style="background-color:#E9E9E9"|Seats
|-
| style="text-align:left;" |
Communist Party of China (中国共产党)
Revolutionary Committee of the Kuomintang (民革
China Democratic League (民盟)
China Democratic National Construction Association (民建)
China Association for Promoting Democracy (民进)
Chinese Peasants' and Workers' Democratic Party (农工民主党)
Zhigongdang of China (中国致公党)
Jiusan Society (九三学社)
Taiwan Democratic Self-Government League (台盟)
Non-partisans
| style="vertical-align:top;" |2,979
|-
|style="text-align:left;background-color:#E9E9E9"|Total
|width="30" style="text-align:right;background-color:#E9E9E9"|2,979
|}

External links
 Official website of the NPC

National People's Congresses
1998 in China